The Greater London League was a football league for clubs in and around London. It was formed in 1964 by a merger of the London League and the Aetolian League, after the two leagues had run a joint league cup the previous season due to both struggling for numbers.

History
The league initially ran with A and B sections, before being divided into a Premier Division and First Division in 1965. In 1967 the divisions were renamed Division One and Division Two. A reduction in the number of clubs saw a single division formed for the 1969–70 season, and although it lost another club at the end of the season, it was split back into two sections the following season. At the end of the 1970–71 season it merged with the Metropolitan League (which had lost several clubs to the Southern League) to form the Metropolitan–London League.

List of champions

Member clubs
Member clubs during the league's existence included:

Barkingside
Battersea United
Beckenham Town
Bexley
Brentstonians
BROB Barnet
Canvey Island
CAV Athletic
Chertsey Town
Chingford
Cray Wanderers
Crittall Athletic
Crockenhill
Deal Town
East Ham United
Epping Town
Eton Manor
Faversham Town
Ford United
Hatfield Town
Heathside Sports
Hermes
Highfield
London Transport
Merton United
Penhill Standard
Northern Polytechnic
Royal Arsenal Sports
ROFSA
Sheppey United
Slade Green Athletic
Snowdown Colliery Welfare
Swanley Town
Tunbridge Wells Rangers
Ulysses
Vokins
West Thurrock Athletic
Whitstable Town
Willesden
Woodford Town
Woolwich Polytechnic

In addition, some clubs' first teams competed in the league's reserve section. These included:

Alma United
Basildon United
British Ropes
Brimsdown Rovers
Crittall Sports
East Thurrock United
Eastley Athletic
Green & Siley Weir
Harold Hill
Haringey Borough
India & Millwall Dock
J&E Hall Sports
Muirhead Sports
Pegasus
Rolenmill
Smiths Industries
STC New Southgate
Welwyn Garden City

See also
List of Greater London League seasons

References

 
Defunct football leagues in England
 Greater
Sports leagues established in 1964
1964 establishments in England
Sports leagues disestablished in 1971
1971 disestablishments in England